The Badminton Asia Junior Championships is a tournament organized by the Badminton Asia governing body to crown the best junior badminton players (under-19) in Asia.

Championships (U19)
The table below gives an overview of all host cities and countries of the Asia Championships (2003 and 2020 not held).

All time medal table
Medals from 1997 to 2019.

Previous winners

Individual competition

Team competition
The team competition were divided into men's and women's team events until 2005.

The mixed team event is held since 2006.

Youth Championships (U17 & U15)
Badminton Asia U17 & U15 Junior Championships or Asian Youth Badminton Championships:

Previous winners

Individual competition U-17

Individual competition U-15

Asian junior champions who later became Asian champions
List of players who have won Asian Junior Championships and later won the Asia Championships to become both the Asian Junior Champion and Asian Champion.

See also 
 Badminton Asia Championships

Notes

References 

 tournamentsoftware
 Results1
 hkolympic.org
 badminton.rengo.net
 Historical Results of Asia Championships

 
Asia Junior
Recurring sporting events established in 1997
1997 establishments in Asia